Remya is a genus of Hawaiian plants in the tribe Astereae within the family Asteraceae.

 Species
 Remya kauaiensis Hillebr.  - Kaua'i
 Remya mauiensis Hillebr. - Maui
 Remya montgomeryi W.L.Wagner & D.R.Herbst - Kaua'i

References

Astereae
Asteraceae genera
Endemic flora of Hawaii